The Berkeley Software Distribution or Berkeley Standard Distribution (BSD) is a discontinued operating system based on Research Unix, developed and distributed by the Computer Systems Research Group (CSRG) at the University of California, Berkeley. The term "BSD" commonly refers to its open-source descendants, including FreeBSD, OpenBSD, NetBSD, and DragonFly BSD.

BSD was initially called Berkeley Unix because it was based on the source code of the original Unix developed at Bell Labs. In the 1980s, BSD was widely adopted by workstation vendors in the form of proprietary Unix variants such as DEC Ultrix and Sun Microsystems SunOS due to its permissive licensing and familiarity to many technology company founders and engineers.

Although these proprietary BSD derivatives were largely superseded in the 1990s by UNIX SVR4 and OSF/1, later releases provided the basis for several open-source operating systems including FreeBSD, OpenBSD, NetBSD, DragonFly BSD, Darwin, and TrueOS. These, in turn, have been used by proprietary operating systems, including Apple's macOS and iOS, which derived from them, and Microsoft Windows, which used (at least) part of its TCP/IP code, which was legal. Code from FreeBSD was also used to create the operating system for the PlayStation 5, PlayStation 4, PlayStation 3, PlayStation Vita, and Nintendo Switch.

History

The earliest distributions of Unix from Bell Labs in the 1970s included the source code to the operating system, allowing researchers at universities to modify and extend Unix. The operating system arrived at Berkeley in 1974, at the request of computer science professor Bob Fabry who had been on the program committee for the Symposium on Operating Systems Principles where Unix was first presented. A PDP-11/45 was bought to run the system, but for budgetary reasons, this machine was shared with the mathematics and statistics groups at Berkeley, who used RSTS, so that Unix only ran on the machine eight hours per day (sometimes during the day, sometimes during the night). A larger PDP-11/70 was installed at Berkeley the following year, using money from the Ingres database project. Understanding BSD requires delving far back into the history of Unix, the operating system first released by AT&T Bell Labs in 1969. BSD began life as a variant of Unix that programmers at the University of California at Berkeley, initially led by Bill Joy, began developing in the late 1970s.

At first, BSD was not a clone of Unix, or even a substantially different version of it. It just included some extra features, which were intertwined with code owned by AT&T.

In 1975, Ken Thompson took a sabbatical from Bell Labs and came to Berkeley as a visiting professor. He helped to install Version 6 Unix and started working on a Pascal implementation for the system. Graduate students Chuck Haley and Bill Joy improved Thompson's Pascal and implemented an improved text editor, ex. Other universities became interested in the software at Berkeley, and so in 1977 Joy started compiling the first Berkeley Software Distribution (1BSD), which was released on March 9, 1978. 1BSD was an add-on to Version 6 Unix rather than a complete operating system in its own right. Some thirty copies were sent out.

The second Berkeley Software Distribution (2BSD), released in May 1979, included updated versions of the 1BSD software as well as two new programs by Joy that persist on Unix systems to this day: the vi text editor (a visual version of ex) and the C shell. Some 75 copies of 2BSD were sent out by Bill Joy.

A VAX computer was installed at Berkeley in 1978, but the port of Unix to the VAX architecture, UNIX/32V, did not take advantage of the VAX's virtual memory capabilities. The kernel of 32V was largely rewritten to include Berkeley graduate student Özalp Babaoğlu's virtual memory implementation, and a complete operating system including the new kernel, ports of the 2BSD utilities to the VAX, and the utilities from 32V was released as 3BSD at the end of 1979. 3BSD was also alternatively called Virtual VAX/UNIX or VMUNIX (for Virtual Memory Unix), and BSD kernel images were normally called /vmunix until 4.4BSD.

After 4.3BSD was released in June 1986, it was determined that BSD would move away from the aging VAX platform. The Power 6/32 platform (codenamed "Tahoe") developed by Computer Consoles Inc. seemed promising at the time, but was abandoned by its developers shortly thereafter. Nonetheless, the 4.3BSD-Tahoe port (June 1988) proved valuable, as it led to a separation of machine-dependent and machine-independent code in BSD which would improve the system's future portability.

In addition to portability, the CSRG worked on an implementation of the OSI network protocol stack, improvements to the kernel virtual memory system and (with Van Jacobson of LBL) new TCP/IP algorithms to accommodate the growth of the Internet.

Until then, all versions of BSD used proprietary AT&T Unix code, and were therefore subject to an AT&T software license. Source code licenses had become very expensive and several outside parties had expressed interest in a separate release of the networking code, which had been developed entirely outside AT&T and would not be subject to the licensing requirement. This led to Networking Release 1 (Net/1), which was made available to non-licensees of AT&T code and was freely redistributable under the terms of the BSD license. It was released in June 1989.

After Net/1, BSD developer Keith Bostic proposed that more non-AT&T sections of the BSD system be released under the same license as Net/1. To this end, he started a project to reimplement most of the standard Unix utilities without using the AT&T code. Within eighteen months, all of the AT&T utilities had been replaced, and it was determined that only a few AT&T files remained in the kernel. These files were removed, and the result was the June 1991 release of Networking Release 2 (Net/2), a nearly complete operating system that was freely distributable.

Net/2 was the basis for two separate ports of BSD to the Intel 80386 architecture: the free 386BSD by William Jolitz and the proprietary BSD/386 (later renamed BSD/OS) by Berkeley Software Design (BSDi). 386BSD itself was short-lived, but became the initial code base of the NetBSD and FreeBSD projects that were started shortly thereafter.

BSDi soon found itself in legal trouble with AT&T's Unix System Laboratories (USL) subsidiary, then the owners of the System V copyright and the Unix trademark. The USL v. BSDi lawsuit was filed in 1992 and led to an injunction on the distribution of Net/2 until the validity of USL's copyright claims on the source could be determined. The lawsuit slowed development of the free-software descendants of BSD for nearly two years while their legal status was in question, and as a result systems based on the Linux kernel, which did not have such legal ambiguity, gained greater support. The lawsuit was settled in January 1994, largely in Berkeley's favor. Of the 18,000 files in the Berkeley distribution, only three had to be removed and 70 modified to show USL copyright notices. A further condition of the settlement was that USL would not file further lawsuits against users and distributors of the Berkeley-owned code in the upcoming 4.4BSD release.

The final release from Berkeley was 1995's 4.4BSD-Lite Release 2, after which the CSRG was dissolved and development of BSD at Berkeley ceased. Since then, several variants based directly or indirectly on 4.4BSD-Lite (such as FreeBSD, NetBSD, OpenBSD and DragonFly BSD) have been maintained.

The permissive nature of the BSD license has allowed many other operating systems, both open-source and proprietary, to incorporate BSD source code. For example, Microsoft Windows used BSD code in its implementation of TCP/IP and bundles recompiled versions of BSD's command-line networking tools since Windows 2000. Darwin, the basis for Apple's macOS and iOS, is based on 4.4BSD-Lite2 and FreeBSD. Various commercial Unix operating systems, such as Solaris, also incorporate BSD code.

Relationship to Research Unix
Starting with the 8th Edition, versions of Research Unix at Bell Labs had a close relationship to BSD. This began when 4.1cBSD for the VAX was used as the basis for Research Unix 8th Edition. This continued in subsequent versions, such as the 9th Edition, which incorporated source code and improvements from 4.3BSD. The result was that these later versions of Research Unix were closer to BSD than they were to System V. In a Usenet posting from 2000, Dennis Ritchie described this relationship between BSD and Research Unix:

Relationship to System V
Eric S. Raymond summarizes the longstanding relationship between System V and BSD, stating, "The divide was roughly between longhairs and shorthairs; programmers and technical people tended to line up with Berkeley and BSD, more business-oriented types with AT&T and System V."

In 1989, David A. Curry wrote about the differences between BSD and System V. He characterized System V as being often regarded as the "standard Unix." However, he described BSD as more popular among university and government computer centers, due to its advanced features and performance:

Technology

Berkeley sockets

Berkeley's Unix was the first Unix to include libraries supporting the Internet Protocol stacks: Berkeley sockets. A Unix implementation of IP's predecessor, the ARPAnet's NCP, with FTP and Telnet clients, had been produced at the University of Illinois in 1975, and was available at Berkeley. However, the memory scarcity on the PDP-11 forced a complicated design and performance problems.

By integrating sockets with the Unix operating system's file descriptors, it became almost as easy to read and write data across a network as it was to access a disk. The AT&T laboratory eventually released their own STREAMS library, which incorporated much of the same functionality in a software stack with a different architecture, but the wide distribution of the existing sockets library reduced the impact of the new API. Early versions of BSD were used to form Sun Microsystems' SunOS, founding the first wave of popular Unix workstations.

Binary compatibility
Some BSD operating systems can run native software of several other operating systems on the same architecture, using a binary compatibility layer. This is much simpler and faster than emulation; for example, it allows applications intended for Linux to be run at effectively full speed. This makes BSDs not only suitable for server environments, but also for workstation ones, given the increasing availability of commercial or closed-source software for Linux only. This also allows administrators to migrate legacy commercial applications, which may have only supported commercial Unix variants, to a more modern operating system, retaining the functionality of such applications until they can be replaced by a better alternative.

Standards
Current BSD operating system variants support many of the common IEEE, ANSI, ISO, and POSIX standards, while retaining most of the traditional BSD behavior. Like AT&T Unix, the BSD kernel is monolithic, meaning that device drivers in the kernel run in privileged mode, as part of the core of the operating system.

BSD descendants

Several operating systems are based on BSD, including FreeBSD, OpenBSD, NetBSD, MidnightBSD, MirOS BSD, GhostBSD, Darwin and DragonFly BSD. Both NetBSD and FreeBSD were created in 1993. They were initially derived from 386BSD (also known as "Jolix"), and merged the 4.4BSD-Lite source code in 1994. OpenBSD was forked from NetBSD in 1995, and DragonFly BSD was forked from FreeBSD in 2003.

BSD was also used as the basis for several proprietary versions of Unix, such as Sun's SunOS, Sequent's DYNIX, NeXT's NeXTSTEP, DEC's Ultrix and OSF/1 AXP (now Tru64 UNIX). NeXTSTEP later became the foundation for Apple Inc.'s macOS.

See also
 BSD Daemon
 BSD licenses
 Comparison of BSD operating systems
 List of BSD operating systems
 Unix wars

References

Bibliography
 Marshall K. McKusick, Keith Bostic, Michael J. Karels, John S. Quartermain, The Design and Implementation of the 4.4BSD Operating System (Addison Wesley, 1996)
 Marshall K. McKusick, George V. Neville-Neil, The Design and Implementation of the FreeBSD Operating System (Addison Wesley, August 2, 2004)
 Samuel J. Leffler, Marshall K. McKusick, Michael J. Karels, John S. Quarterman, The Design and Implementation of the 4.3BSD UNIX Operating System (Addison Wesley, November 1989)
 
 Peter H. Salus, The Daemon, the GNU & The Penguin (Reed Media Services, September 1, 2008)
 Peter H. Salus, A Quarter Century of UNIX (Addison Wesley, June 1, 1994)
 Peter H. Salus, Casting the Net (Addison-Wesley, March 1995)

External links

 A timeline of BSD and Research UNIX
 UNIX History – History of UNIX and BSD using diagrams
 The Design and Implementation of the 4.4BSD Operating System
 The Unix Tree:  Source code and manuals for old versions of Unix
 EuroBSDCon, an annual event in Europe in September, October or November, founded in 2001 
 BSDCan, a conference in Ottawa, Ontario, Canada, held annually in May since 2004, in June since 2015
 AsiaBSDCon, a conference in Tokyo, held annually in March of each year, since 2007
 mdoc.su – short manual page URLs for FreeBSD, OpenBSD, NetBSD and DragonFly BSD, a web-service written in nginx
 BXR.SU – Super User's BSD Cross Reference, a userland and kernel source code search engine based on OpenGrok and nginx

 
1977 software
Free software operating systems
Free software programmed in C
Operating system families
Science and technology in the San Francisco Bay Area
University of California, Berkeley